
Bar Hercules, historically the Pillars of Hercules, is a pub in Greek Street, Soho, London, originally named for the Pillars of Hercules of antiquity. Most of what exists was built around 1910, but the pub dates back to 1733.  The road at the side of the pub through the arch is named Manette Street, after Dr Manette, one of the characters from A Tale of Two Cities, who is described in the book as living near Soho Square.

More recently, the pub has been favoured by many figures from the London literary scene, including Martin Amis, Ian Hamilton, Julian Barnes and Ian McEwan. Clive James named his second book of literary criticism (At the Pillars of Hercules) after it, apparently because that was where most of the pieces within it were commissioned, delivered or written. Singer Nick Drake is also said to have frequented the pub during his time in London, and theatre designer Sean Kenny drank there with his staff in the 1960s, their design studio being a few steps from the pub's back door.

The pub closed on 24 February 2018, reopening later in the year as Bar Hercules under new owners Be At One.

Sources

References

External links
https://londonist.com/pubs/the-pillar-of-hercules. Accessed 10 September 2017.

1733 establishments in England
Buildings and structures completed in 1733
Pubs in Soho
Greek Street